Ethyl caffeate is an ester of a hydroxycinnamic acid, a naturally occurring organic compound.

Natural occurrences 
It can be found in Bidens pilosa, in Polygonum amplexicaule var. sinense.

It is also found in Huáng bǎi, one of the fifty fundamental herbs of traditional Chinese medicine, also known also as Cortex Phellodendri, the bark of one of two species of Phellodendron tree: Phellodendron amurense or Phellodendron chinense.

It is also found in wines such as Verdicchio, a white wine from Marche, Italy.

Health effects 
Ethyl caffeate suppresses NF-kappaB activation and its downstream inflammatory mediators, iNOS, COX-2 and PGE2 in vitro or in mouse skin.

Ethyl caffeate administered intraperitoneally in rats previously is able to prevent the dimethylnitrosamine-induced loss in body and liver weight, as well as to reduce the degree of liver injury. It can be considered as a promising natural compound for future application in chronic liver disease.

Pharmacophore modeling, molecular docking, and molecular dynamics simulation studies also indicate that ethyl caffeate is a potential inhibitor of the aldosterone synthase (CYP11B2), a key enzyme for the biosynthesis of aldosterone, which plays a significant role for the regulation of blood pressure.

Chemistry 
Ethyl caffeate reacts with methylamine to produce green pigments.

See also 
 Phenolic compounds in wine

References 

Hydroxycinnamic acid esters
Ethyl esters
Vinylogous carboxylic acids